George William Sergeant (December 2, 1881 – August 26, 1971) was an attorney and mayor of Dallas,Texas from 1932 to 1935.

Biography
Sergeant was born on December 2, 1881 in Mansfield, Texas to Gustavis A. Sergeant and Harriet (Hattie) P. Baldwin. He married Mary Marshall Brown, daughter of Dr. Horace M. Brown and Mary Elizabeth Rudd, on August 25, 1909 in Union, West Virginia. They had two children. Their first child, Mary Marshall Sergeant, died in infancy.

He attended school in Dallas and graduated from the University of Texas where he also received his law degree. In 1908 he began private practice in Dallas, but was soon appointed city judge. He served in a number of political positions. He was mayor during the time of the Texas Centennial Exposition held at Fair Park in Dallas, and has been referred to as "The Centennial Mayor.

He wrote a number of books including History of the First Presbyterian Church of Dallas, Texas (1943) and History of the Christian Church (1948).  He served as deacon at Highland Park Presbyterian Church for 35 years becoming an elder in 1941.

Sergeant died August 26, 1971 in Dallas and was interred at the Oak Cliff Cemetery.

References

1881 births
1971 deaths
Mayors of Dallas
20th-century American politicians